Sev or SEV may refer to:

 Sev (food), an Indian snack food; tomato Sev, palak sev, plain sev
Sev puri (redirect from Sev Puri) Indian snack and a type of chaat from Mumbai
Sev mamra, Indian snack  mixture of spicy dry ingredients such as puffed rice (mamra), savoury noodles (sev) and peanuts. 
Sev (band) rock band from the Northern Virginia area who appeared in a national advertising campaign for Pepsi Blue
 "Sev" (song) (Turkish "love"), the Turkish entry to the Eurovision Song Contest 1995

People with the name
 Sev Lewkowicz (born 1951), musical composer, producer, arranger and keyboard player based in the UK
 Sev Statik, a hip hop musician from Albany, New York, US
 Sev Aszkenazy, American real estate developer in San Fernando,  born in 1961.

Acronyms
 SEV (company), a power company of the Faroe Islands
 Comecon, a former economic organization under the leadership of the Soviet Union
 Sociedad Española de Vexilología, the Spanish Society of Vexillology
Union of Transport Workers, Swiss trade union, from the initials of its former name in German
 Sevenoaks railway station, Kent, National Rail station code SEV
 Space Empires V, 2006 4X turn based strategy game

Science and technology
 Solar electric vehicle
 Space Exploration Vehicle
 Secure Encrypted Virtualization, an AMD technology
 Nyarafolo language (ISO 639 code)

See also
 Sophie et Virginie, a 1990 cartoon series; See: Daniel Russo